Private Lies: Infidelity and Betrayal of Intimacy is a non-fiction book by psychiatrist and family therapist Frank Pittman, M.D.  Private Lies was first published in hardcover edition in 1989 by W. Then, W. Norton & Company by the same publisher in a paperback edition in 1990.

Dr. Pittman's book has been referred to as "widely quoted", by Psychology Today.  It has been cited by 24 other books on marriage and family therapy counseling.<ref>Hope-Focused Marriage Counseling: A Guide to Brief Therapy, Everett L. Worthington; Marriage, Family, and Sexuality (Issues in Focus), Kerby Anderson; Affair-Proof Your Marriage : Understanding, Preventing and Surviving an Affair, Lana Staheli; Loving Relationships II: The Secrets of a Great Relationship, Sondra Ray; Technology, Spirituality, & Social Trends (Probing the Headlines Series), Kerby Anderson; The Fall and Rise of Freedom of Contract, Francis H. Buckley; We Can Work It Out: How to Solve Conflicts, Save Your Marriage, C. Notarius; Why Men Have Affairs: Real Life Solutions for Men, Women and Couples, Irwin M. Marcus; Reconciliation: A Study of Biblical Families in Conflict, Michael S. Moore; Reptiles in Love: Ending Destructive Fights and Evolving Toward More Loving Relationships, Don Ph.D. Ferguson; Loving in Flow: How the Happiest Couples Get and Stay That Way, Susan K. Perry; Why Great Men Fall, Wayde Goodall; Authentic Human Sexuality: An Integrated Christian Approach, Judith K. Balswick; Cut Loose: (Mostly) Older Women Talk About the End of (Mostly) Long-Term Relationships, Nan Bauer-Maglin; Beyond Romance: Making Love Last, Robert H. Simmons PhD; Southern History across the Color Line, Nell Irvin Painter; Multigenerational Family Therapy (Haworth Marriage and the Family), David S. Freeman; The Dance of Deception: A Guide to Authenticity and Truth-Telling in Women's Relationships, Harriet Lerner; Daddy's Little Girl and Mommy's Little Boy, Zester Hatfield; Resurrecting Sex: Solving Sexual Problems and Revolutionizing Your Relationship, David Schnarch; Couples Group Psychotherapy, Judith Coche; Transforming Anxiety, Transcending Shame, Rex Briggs; Avoiding Mr. Wrong (and What To Do If You Didn't) Ten Men Who Will Ruin Your Life, Stephen Arterburn; Before A Bad Goodbye, Tim Clinton.</ref>

Books by Frank Pittman
 Turning Points: Treating Families in Transition and Crisis, Frank Pittman, M.D., A Norton Professional Book, (Hardcover), W. W. Norton & Company; 1st ed edition, May 1987, 
 Private Lies: Infidelity and Betrayal of Intimacy, Frank Pittman, M.D., W. W. Norton & Company; Reprint edition November 1990, 
 Mentiras Privadas (Spanish edition), Amorrortu Editores, September 1994, 
 Man enough: fathers, sons and the search for masculinity, Frank Pittman, M.D., Perigee Trade; Reprint edition October 1, 1994, 
 Grow Up!: How Taking Responsibility Can Make You a Happy Adult, Golden Guides from St. Martin's Press, July 30, 1999

See also
 psychotherapy
 family therapy
 mental health
 infidelity

References

External links
Official sites
 Private Lies, W. W. Norton & Company
 Beyond Betrayal: Life After Infidelity, Psychology Today, article by Dr. Frank Pittman, commenting on his book
Search
 Private Lies, Google Scholar
 Private Lies, text at Google Books
 Private Lies, Google News
Media
 More news articles, Google News
 Infidelity Comes Out of the Closet, New York TimesApril 29, 1999
 An Interview with Frank Pittman, MD, by Victor Yalom, PhD, Evolution of Psychotherapy Conference, 2000 (www.psychotherapy.net)
 Infidelity reaches beyond having sex, By Karen S. Peterson, USA Today, 1/8/2003
 Dear Ann: Thanks for 47 years of advice, USA Today, 06/23/2002
 Marriage experts converge here; top tip is don't split, The Atlanta Journal-Constitution, 06/21/06
 Search for a soul mate, or love the one you're with?, 5/28/2003, USA Today Study: Divorce, living together new norms, USA Today Why men drag their feet down the aisle, 06/26/2002, USA Today Cohabiting can make marriage an iffy proposition, Even married, men may still feel less committed, July 8, 2002, USA Today Work & Family: Couples separate checking accounts, The Wall Street Journal'', February 24, 2005

Psychology books
1989 non-fiction books
W. W. Norton & Company books